Saline County is a county in the U.S. state of Nebraska. As of the 2010 United States Census, the population was 14,200. Its county seat is Wilber.

In the Nebraska license plate system, Saline County is represented by the prefix 22 (it had the twenty-second-largest number of vehicles registered in the state when the license plate system was established in 1922).

History
Saline County was formed in 1855 and organized in 1867. The first permanent settler arrived in 1858.

Geography
The terrain of Saline County is composed of low rolling hills, sloping to the east-southeast. Most of the county's area is devoted to agriculture. The Big Blue River flows southward in the eastern part of the county. The middle and southern parts of the county are drained by Swan Creek and Turkey Creek, which combine and discharge into Big Blue River at the county's east boundary line close to its SE corner.

Major highways

  U.S. Highway 6
  Nebraska Highway 15
  Nebraska Highway 33
  Nebraska Highway 41
  Nebraska Highway 74
  Nebraska Highway 103

Adjacent counties

 Lancaster County – northeast
 Gage County – southeast
 Jefferson County – south
 Thayer County – southwest
 Fillmore County – west
 York County – northwest
 Seward County – north

Protected areas
 Willard Meyer Natural Resource District - Swan Lake

Demographics

As of the 2000 United States Census, there were 13,843 people, 5,188 households, and 3,507 families in the county. The population density was 24 people per square mile (9/km2). There were 5,611 housing units at an average density of 10 per square mile (4/km2). The racial makeup of the county was 92.99% White, 0.36% Black or African American, 0.38% Native American, 1.70% Asian, 0.03% Pacific Islander, 3.40% from other races, and 1.15% from two or more races. 6.58% of the population were Hispanic or Latino of any race.

There were 5,188 households, out of which 32.80% had children under the age of 18 living with them, 56.50% were married couples living together, 7.20% had a female householder with no husband present, and 32.40% were non-families. 27.50% of all households were made up of individuals, and 14.30% had someone living alone who was 65 years of age or older. The average household size was 2.50 and the average family size was 3.04.

The county population contained 25.10% under the age of 18, 12.30% from 18 to 24, 25.00% from 25 to 44, 20.30% from 45 to 64, and 17.20% who were 65 years of age or older. The median age was 36 years. For every 100 females there were 97.80 males. For every 100 females age 18 and over, there were 95.10 males.

The median income for a household in the county was $35,914, and the median income for a family was $44,199. Males had a median income of $30,467 versus $22,690 for females. The per capita income for the county was $16,287. About 6.40% of families and 9.40% of the population were below the poverty line, including 8.90% of those under age 18 and 9.00% of those age 65 or over.

Communities

Cities
 Crete
 Friend
 Wilber (county seat)

Villages

 De Witt
 Dorchester
 Swanton
 Tobias
 Western

Unincorporated communities
 Berks
 Pleasant Hill
 Shestak

Politics
Saline County was formerly strongly Democratic, voting Republican only four times between 1900 and 1968. From 1972 to 2012, it was considered a swing county in presidential elections, supporting the national winner in every election except 1988 and 2012 and consistently voting similarly to the national popular vote. However, in 2016, the county swung to the right, and since that election has weighed in as more than 20 percentage points more Republican than the nation.

See also
 National Register of Historic Places listings in Saline County, Nebraska

References

External links
 County website
 

 
1867 establishments in Nebraska
Populated places established in 1867